Bloody Elbow is a news website that covers the sports of mixed martial arts (MMA), boxing, kickboxing, Brazilian Jiu-jitsu, and other traditional martial arts and combat sports. Founded in 2007, the site is notable for its investigative reporting, breaking news coverage, opinion and analysis. It operates as part of the SB Nation network of sports blogging sites owned by Vox Media. The website is a part of the growing collection of MMA focused media outlets and provides analysis as well as compantary of multiple aspects of MMA.

Overview 
Founder Nate Wilcox (Kid Nate) recruited Luke Thomas to help run Bloody Elbow on May 21, 2007. Thomas worked as editor in chief of Bloody Elbow until 2011. Brent Brookhouse served as Bloody Elbow's managing editor from 2011 to 2015, before being replaced by Anton Tabuena from 2015 to present. 

Called "critically acclaimed" by the New York Post, Bloody Elbow was reviewed as one of the best MMA news & media blogs online. Currently it is the third most popular MMA media & news website in the US according to Similarweb. In 2017, Bloody Elbow editor Karim Zidan appeared on an episode of HBO's Real Sports with Bryant Gumbel to discuss his work covering Chechen dictator Ramzan Kadyrov's influence in the world of mixed martial arts. Among Bloody Elbow's regular contributors is Eugene S. Robinson, lead singer of the band Oxbow (band). Other notable contributors to Bloody Elbow include UFC veterans such as the late Josh Samman, women's MMA pioneer Roxanne Modafferi, and Ben Saunders,. Bloody Elbow's reporting has been sourced in many mainstream publications, including The New York Times, The Washington Post, The Advocate (LGBT magazine), Sports Illustrated, Forbes. and The New Yorker. Over the years Bloody Elbow has featured interviews with hundreds of professional MMA fighters as well as characters outside of the sport including Anthony Bourdain and Ed O'Neill. 

Known for investigative reporting, Bloody Elbow has been among the first to uncover and report in-depth on the finances of MMA promotions such as the Ultimate Fighting Championship, Bellator MMA, and ONE Championship. Bloody Elbow was also first to report and go in-depth on the major class-action antitrust lawsuit filed against the UFC by its fighters, who are calling for "fair" business practices and better pay. Bloody Elbow is among a number of media organizations and professionals that are currently blacklisted by the Ultimate Fighting Championship. The website has been a useful resource for academics studying MMA culture and trends.

Awards 
Bloody Elbow has been nominated as Media Source of the Year at the World MMA Awards in 2014, 2015, 2017, 2018 and 2019. Brent Brookhouse was nominated for MMA Journalist of the Year at the World MMA Awards in 2016. Karim Zidan was nominated for MMA Journalist of the Year at the World MMA Awards in 2017, 2018 and 2019.

See also
 MMA Fighting
 MMAjunkie.com
 Sherdog

References

Mixed martial arts websites
Internet properties established in 2001